Suzanne Patricia Orr (born 6 February 1982) is an Australian politician. She has been a Labor member of the Australian Capital Territory Legislative Assembly since October 2016, representing the electorate of Yerrabi. She worked as an urban planner before her election.

Biography
Orr was born in Canberra and grew up in Giralang.  While growing up her family fostered more than 200 children. The experience made her aware from a young age that government has a big role in helping when people need extra support. She worked in the hospitality and tourism industries. Orr completed university as a mature age student and along with her cousins became part of the first generation in her father's family to be university educated.  After completing a master's degree she began a career as an urban planner and also worked for the Australian Public Service.

Political career
Orr joined the Australian Labor Party in 2013. She organised a successful campaign along with 350.org to encourage the ACT Government to divest from fossil fuel companies soon after being involved in the party.

In the 2016 ACT election, Orr was elected to the ACT Legislative Assembly as the ACT Labor Member for Yerrabi. On 26 August 2019, she was appointed as the Minister for Community Services and Facilities, Minister for Disability, Minister for Employment and Workplace Safety and Minister for Government Services and Procurement in the Second Barr Ministry after a reshuffle.

Orr moved onto the backbench after the 2020 ACT Election and the reshuffle that formed the Third Barr Ministry on 4 November 2020.

Personal
Orr is a qualified Urban Planner and is passionate about making cities the best they can be for the people that live in them, while at the same time minimising the impact urban lifestyles have on the environment.

As a lesbian member of the LGBTIQ community Orr was a passionate advocate for marriage equality during the 2017 same-sex marriage plebiscite and is Patron of Yes!Fest.

See also

 List of LGBTI holders of political offices in Australia

References

|-

1982 births
Living people
Australian Labor Party members of the Australian Capital Territory Legislative Assembly
Members of the Australian Capital Territory Legislative Assembly
21st-century Australian politicians